Konstantin I may refer to:

 Konstantin of Rostov (1186–1218)
 Constantine Tikh of Bulgaria (ruled 1257–1277)